Branislav Đukanović (Cyrillic: Бранислав Ђукановић; born 12 January 1959) is a Montenegrin football manager and former goalkeeper.

As a goalkeeper, after playing his first professional season with a Second League OFK Titograd, he has played mostly in the Yugoslav First League with FK Budućnost Podgorica, FK Partizan and FK Sutjeska Nikšić.

After retiring, he has become a goalkeeping coach. He has been coaching the goalkeepers of the Montenegro under-21 team since 2007.

External links
 Playing profile at Playerhistory

1959 births
Living people
Footballers from Podgorica
Association football goalkeepers
Montenegrin footballers
Yugoslav footballers
OFK Titograd players
FK Budućnost Podgorica players
FK Partizan players
FK Sutjeska Nikšić players
Yugoslav First League players
Yugoslav Second League players
Montenegrin expatriate sportspeople in Russia